New Jersey's 31st Legislative District is one of 40 districts that make up the map for the New Jersey Legislature. It covers the Hudson County municipalities of Bayonne and most of Jersey City.

Demographic information
As of the 2020 United States census, the district had a population of 260,634, of whom 206,103 (79.1%) were of voting age. The racial makeup of the district was 81,195 (31.2%) White, 58,329 (22.4%) African American, 1,564 (0.6%) Native American, 56,549 (21.7%) Asian, 155 (0.1%) Pacific Islander, 36,894 (14.2%) from some other race, and 25,948 (10.0%) from two or more races. Hispanic or Latino of any race were 65,872 (25.3%) of the population.

The district had 156,818 registered voters , of whom 54,099 (34.5%) were registered as unaffiliated, 85,197 (54.3%) were registered as Democrats, 14,795 (9.4%) were registered as Republicans, and 2,727 (1.7%) were registered to other parties.

Political representation
For the 2022–2023 session, the district is represented in the State Senate by Sandra Bolden Cunningham (D, Jersey City) and in the General Assembly by Angela V. McKnight (D, Jersey City) and William Sampson (D, Bayonne).

The legislative district overlaps with New Jersey's 8th and 10th congressional districts.

Apportionment history
Throughout the entire history of the 31st District since 1973, the district always consisted of Bayonne and southern Jersey City. In order to fulfill the requirement that legislative districts be made as equal in population as possible, wards were added and removed as necessary from Jersey City to get the necessary population. As the district was always heavily urban in nature and is closely associated with the Hudson County Democratic machine, no Republican has ever been elected to the district since its creation in 1973; one of nine districts statewide to have never sent a member of another party to the Legislature.

Election history

Election results

Senate

General Assembly

References

Hudson County, New Jersey
31